The 2014 Indian general election polls in Delhi for seven Lok Sabha seats was held in a single phase on 10 April 2014. As of 16 December 2013, the total voter strength of Delhi is 11,932,069.

The Main political parties are Aam Aadmi Party, Bharatiya Janata Party and Indian National Congress.

Opinion polling

Election schedule

Constituency wise Election schedule are given below –

Candidates

Results
NCT of Delhi (7)

References

Indian general elections in Delhi
Delhi
2010s in Delhi